This is a list of years in Austria. See also the timeline of Austrian history.  For only articles about years in Austria that have been written, see :Category:Years in Austria.

Twenty-first century

Twentieth century

Nineteenth century

Eighteenth century

See also 
 List of years by country

Cities in Austria
 Timeline of Graz
 Timeline of Linz
 Timeline of Salzburg
 Timeline of Vienna

Further reading

External links
 

 
Austria history-related lists
Austria